Eskhar is an urban-type settlement in Chuhuiv Raion of Kharkiv Oblast in Ukraine. It is located on the right bank of the Donets. Eskhar belongs to Novopokrovka settlement hromada, one of the hromadas of Ukraine. Population:

Economy

Transportation
There is passenger traffic.

Eskhar is connected by road with Chuhuiv where there is road access to Highway M03 connecting Kharkiv and Sloviansk.

References

Urban-type settlements in Chuhuiv Raion